o-Xylene (ortho-xylene) is an aromatic hydrocarbon with the formula C6H4(CH3)2, with two methyl substituents bonded to adjacent carbon atoms of a benzene ring (the ortho configuration). It is a constitutional isomer of m-xylene and p-xylene, the mixture being called xylene or xylenes.  o-Xylene is a colourless slightly oily flammable liquid.

Production and use
Petroleum contains about one weight percent xylenes.  Most o-xylene is produced by cracking petroleum, which affords a distribution of aromatic compounds, including xylene isomers.  m-Xylene is isomerized to o-xylene.  Net production was approximately 500,000 tons in the year 2000.

o-Xylene is largely used in the production of phthalic anhydride, which is a precursor to many materials, drugs, and other chemicals. Related to their easy oxidation, the methyl groups are susceptible to halogenation.  When treated with elemental bromine, these groups are brominated, yielding xylylene dibromide:
C6H4(CH3)2  +  2 Br2  →  C6H4(CH2Br)2  +  2 HBr

Toxicity and exposure
Effects vary with animal and xylene isomer. Concerns with xylenes focus on narcotic effects.

References

Alkylbenzenes
C2-Benzenes